Beneath the Skin is the second studio album by Collide, released in January 1996 by Re-Constriction Records.

Reception
Aiding & Abetting praised Beneath the Skin and said "the music and vocals build slowly around a pulsating beat, culminating with a orgy of sonic delights" and "the title track really show off Statik's talent for crafting a massively attractive sound." Alternative Press commended the band for being unique to Re-Constriction Records' roster and was especially praising of the track "Falling Up", which the critic claimed weaves "kaRIN's threads through a quilt of distant voices, submerged electric guitar chords, Laibachian ghosts and a Banshee beat." very atypical for the Re-Constriction label, breaking away from its traditional industrio-guitar sound." Jennifer Barnes of Black Monday "there's a lot that can be done with those contrasts, and I’m not sure they use noise to  fullest potential" and "the music is put together almost flawlessly and is a little too perfect for my taste." Sonic Boom commended the writing of founding member Eric Anest, saying he "is able to compose music which completely compliments Karin's voice without always having to resort to slow drawn out ballads and other conventional roles that female vocalists have been pigeon holed by popular music." A critic at Lollipop Magazine compared the band favorably to Front Line Assembly and Front Line Assembly "Collide creates a sound that is at once mysterious and obvious."

Track listing

Personnel
Adapted from the Beneath the Skin liner notes.

Collide
 Eric Anest (as Statik) – programming, noises, production, engineering, mixing, mastering
 Karin Johnston (as kaRIN) – vocals

Production and design
 Durmel DeLeon – photography
 Susan Jennings – cover art, illustrations, design, photography
 Jack Pedota – photography
 Steve West – photography

Release history

References

External links 
  Beneath the Skin at collide.net
 
  Beneath the Skin at Bandcamp
 Beneath the Skin at iTunes

Collide (band) albums
1996 albums
Re-Constriction Records albums